Jawāmi ul-Hikāyāt wa Lawāmi' ul-Riwāyāt ("Collections of Stories and Illustrations of Histories", commonly known by the shorter title, Jawāmi ul-Hikāyāt, also transcribed Djami al-Hikayat and Jami al-Hikayat) (جوامع الحکایات و لوامع الروایات) is a famous collection of Persian anecdotes written in the early 13th century. It was written by Zahiriddin Nasr Muhammad Aufi, who lived during the reign of Shamsuddin Iltutmish (Altamash) (r. 1211–1236) the third Muslim Turkic sultan of the Sultanate of Delhi, and the book is dedicated to his minister, Nizam al-Mulk Muhammad, son of Abu Sa'id Junaidi.

The book was an encyclopaedia of anecdotage containing mines of interesting information, namely on historical information often not found elsewhere, from mythical times until the end of the rule of the Abbasid Caliph Al-Mustansir.

The entire text of this 2,500 page book is yet to be edited and printed. Currently, only abridged volumes have been published.

The oldest extant manuscript of this work exists in the Bibliothèque nationale de France, dated 1232.

Content
The Jawami ul-Hikayat contains 4 volumes consisting of chapters of unequal length. Zahiriddin Nasr Muhammad Aufi used his personal observations, information from many Arab and Persian works (listed as sources in Jawami), as well as information gathered from individual traders concerning the conditions and life in different countries throughout every chapter. This makes the Jawami ul-Hikayat unique among Persian works.

Work online
 (At Packard Institute)

Catalog information
Catalogue collectif de France (Recherche: Localisation de document: Titre: "Jawami"):

Type de document	Monographies
Auteur(s)	Nizam al-Din, Muhammad (Auteur)
Autre(s)	Awfi, Sadid al-Din al-
Titre		Introduction to the Jawami'u'l-hikayat wa lawami 'u'rriwayat of Sadidu'd-Din Muhammad al-'Awfi
Autre(s) titre(s)	Gawami al-hikayat wa lawami al-riwayat
Langue	Anglais
Publication	London, Luzac & Co. : 1929, Leyden, E. J. BrillDescription		1 vol. (xxiii, 316 p.) -32 cm
Collection		E. J. W.Gibb memorial . New series
Contenu	Contient : Observations on the life and works of the author...;  position of the Jawam. in Persian prose ; conspectus of the sources of the Jawam. ; chronological arrangement and description of all the known mss. of the Jawam. ; comparative index of the hundred chapters of the Jawam. ; complete table of contents of the four parts of the Jawam. ; reclassification of the contents ...; alphabetical list of all the works mentioned in the Jawam.
Exemplaire 1	
Cote et fonds		PM 439.25 in-4
Université de la Sorbonne nouvelle. Service commun de la documentation*Bibliothèque de l'Institut détudes iraniennes. Paris
Exemplaire 2	
Cote et fonds		801.4 NIZ
Université de la Sorbonne nouvelle. Service commun de la documentation*Bibliothèque de l'Orient et du monde arabe. Paris

See also
Persian literature
Shahid Balkhi

References

Persian literature
Middle Eastern chronicles
13th-century history books
Historiography of India
Delhi Sultanate
History books about India
Indian chronicles